Discosauriscidae is a family of stegocephalians from the early Permian. They belong to the Seymouriamorpha, but their affinites to extant tetrapods are debated. They have long been considered reptiliomorphs, but some recent analyses suggest that they are stem-tetrapods.

References

Seymouriamorphs
Cisuralian first appearances
Cisuralian extinctions